Actinodaphne montana is a species of plant in the family Lauraceae. It is a tree endemic to Peninsular Malaysia.
The Latin specific epithet montana refers to mountains or coming from mountains.

References

montana
Endemic flora of Peninsular Malaysia
Trees of Peninsular Malaysia
Least concern plants
Taxonomy articles created by Polbot
Plants described in 1910